Wayne Valley may refer to:
 Wayne Valley High School, New Jersey, United States
 F. Wayne Valley (1914–1986), American businessman, philanthropist, Oakland Raiders owner and football player